"Silver Dew on the Blue Grass Tonight" is a 1945 song by Bob Wills. It was Bob Wills' third #1 song on the Juke Box Folk Record chart, where it spent 14 weeks, three of them in the top position. It was the B-side of the instrumental "Texas Playboy Rag", which peaked at #2 on the chart.

References
 

1945 songs